Unsung is an hour-long music documentary program that airs on TV One which premiered on November 27, 2008. It uncovers the stories behind well-known R&B and hip-hop music artists, bands, or groups which ranked onto the Billboard music charts with a string of hits, only to have their career derailed by a major crisis that caused them to be essentially unappreciated by later generations of contemporary R&B and soul music listeners. The series is produced by production company A. Smith & Co. Productions.

Format 
Each episode usually begins with an artist's upbringing and family, painting a picture of the issues driving them in their music career. Themes of "escaping the hard life of the streets" and "experiencing physical abuse", as well as "signs of musical genius", can be found in many of the lives of Unsung'''s subjects. Those interviewed in this segment of the show typically are relatives and friends, although some celebrities may be interviewed depending on their relation to the artist.

The story then progresses into the trials and triumphs of the artist's early days in the music business, as the artist chases their "big break" which propels them into the limelight on the way to stardom. Fellow artists, music producers, and managers of that time pepper this section of the show with anecdotes of the artist's musical prowess and potential, and possible hints to any problems or issues the artists may have faced in their personal life or in the music business.

The next stage highlights the pinnacle of the artist's fame with the perks and perils that come with it. The show then details a turning point in the artist's life that may have affected their career, some aspect of their personal life or their health. The final act of the show typically highlights a new chapter in the artist's life, new music and plans for the future, or in the case of deceased or retired artists, pays tribute to their musical contributions.Unsung has tailored this formula, depending on the show's subject, to portray artists whose "turning point" occurred for more business or personal reasons, and who may have recovered from it to continue a far less famous, but rewarding, career.  An example includes The Spinners, a legendary R&B group with 17 Billboard Top 40 hits (7 of which were in the top 10) between 1961 and 1980, yet they have never received a Grammy Award nor been inducted into the Rock & Roll Hall of Fame.

Unsung is a television series that originally aired on the TV One network in the United States. The show focuses on the lives and careers of R&B and soul musicians who have not received mainstream recognition for their contributions to the music industry. The show features interviews with the musicians, as well as performances of their hit songs. The show often highlights the struggles and obstacles that these musicians faced throughout their careers, and how they managed to overcome them. Some of the musicians featured on the show include Zapp, The Chi-Lites, and The Delfonics. The show is produced by the company, TV One, and has been airing since 2008.

 Reception 
As of 2010, Unsung has enjoyed steady growth, particularly in African-American households, as each season has aired.

After four seasons, Unsung won an NAACP Image Award in the "Outstanding Information Series or Special" category. Others nominated in this category for 2011 were Anderson Cooper 360° and Washington Watch with Roland Martin. And as of 2018, the series has garnered six NAACP Image Awards.

The Unsung series has provided a platform for artists to tell their own stories as well as given a sense of closure to both the series' fans and the families of the artists who have died, as in the case of Roger Troutman of Zapp. Troutman's brother stated that the public was finally realized the uncertainty about what happened between Roger and Larry Troutman the fatal morning of the 1999 incident that led to death.

While the show has enjoyed strong ratings and critical acclaim, it has also on occasion been criticized for not including some important facts. Jody Watley underscored these assessments in a series of YouTube videos made after the Shalamar episode premiered. (Shalamar was a popular R&B group which included Watley among its members). Similarly, some relatives of David Ruffin made their complaints known after his Unsung episode premiered. Recording artist Stephanie Mills has stated she is not a fan of the show. She admits that she has been approached by producers of the series to either be a commentator or the star of an episode, but she denied their requests. She does not believe she is "unsung".

 Unsung Hollywood 
In October 2013, TV One announced Unsung would receive a spin-off titled Unsung Hollywood, to premiere on February 26, 2014. Unsung Hollywood focuses on actors and comedians, as well as prominent films and TV shows influential in the African American community.  The second season of Unsung Hollywood premiered on February 11, 2015.  Subjects of Unsung Hollywood have included episodes on: Pam Grier, Robin Harris, What's Happening!!, Dick Gregory, Redd Foxx, A Different World, Sheryl Underwood, Vivica A. Fox, Richard Roundtree, Charlie Murphy, Sheryl Lee Ralph, Meagan Good, Cooley High, Hill Harper, Jasmine Guy, and many others.

 Unsung Films 
In October 2015, TV One announced another spin-off under the Unsung franchise. Unsung Films will feature made-for-TV movies/biopics.
 Miki Howard - Love Under New Management: The Miki Howard Story premiered on the network on June 12, 2016.
Switch/Bobby DeBarge - The Bobby DeBarge Story'' premiered on June 29, 2019.

List of artists, bands and groups profiled on Unsung 

 702
 Adina Howard
 After 7
 Al B. Sure
 Al Jarreau
 Alexander O'Neal and Cherrelle
 Avant
 Angela Bofill
 Angela Winbush
 Angie Stone
 Atlantic Starr
 Arrested Development
 Bar-Kays, The
 Betty Wright
 Big Daddy Kane
 Billy Paul
 Billy Preston
 Blue Magic
 Bobby Bland
 Bobby V
 Bobby Womack
 Bone Thugs-n-Harmony
 Bootsy Collins
 Boys, The
 Brand Nubian
 Candi Staton (as part of The Story of Disco)
 Case
 CeCe Peniston
 Chanté Moore
 Cheryl "Pepsii" Riley
 Chic
 Chi-Lites, The
 Christopher Williams
 Chuck Brown
 Clark Sisters, The
 Con Funk Shun
 Crystal Waters
 Das EFX
 David Ruffin (formerly of The Temptations)
 Dave Hollister
 DeBarge
 Deborah Cox
 Delfonics, The
 Deniece Williams
 Digable Planets
 DJ Quik
 Dramatics, The
 Donell Jones
 Donna Summer (as part of The Story of Disco)
 Donny Hathaway
 Dru Hill
 E-40
 Eddie Kendricks (formerly of The Temptations)
 EPMD
 Emotions, The
 Evelyn Champagne King
 Fat Boys, The
 Fat Joe
 Florence Ballard (formerly of The Supremes)
 Force MDs
 Freddie Jackson
 Full Force
 Gerald Levert
 George Clinton
 Geto Boys
 Gil Scott-Heron
 Glenn Jones
 Goodie Mob
 H-Town
 Heatwave
 Heavy D and The Boyz
 Hezekiah Walker
 Howard Hewett
 Hi-Five
 Ike Turner
 Ice-T
 Isaac Hayes
 Jagged Edge
 James Brown
 Jean Carn
 Jennifer Holliday
 Jets, The
 Johnny Gill
 Johnnie Taylor
 Jon B
 Jones Girls, The
 Kashif
 KC and the Sunshine Band
 Keith Washington
 Kelly Price
 Kenny Lattimore
 Kid N' Play
 Klymaxx
 Kool Moe Dee
 Kurupt
 Kwame Holland
 Lakeside
 Leela James
 Lenny Williams
 Lisa Lisa & Cult Jam
 Lloyd
 Lost Boyz
 Lou Rawls
 Lyfe Jennings
 Manhattans, The
 Martha Wash
 Marvelettes, The
 Marvin Sapp
 Mary Wells
 Melba Moore
 Meli'sa Morgan
 Michel'le
 Midnight Star
 Mint Condition
 Miki Howard
 Millie Jackson
 Minnie Riperton
 Monie Love
 Monifah
 Montell Jordan
 Morris Day
 Mtume
 Musical Youth
 Mystikal
 Nate Dogg
 Next
 Norman Connors
 O'Jays, The
 Ohio Players, The
 Otis Redding
 Patrice Rushen
 Peaches & Herb
 Pete Rock
 Phyllis Hyman
 PM Dawn
 Ray Parker Jr.
 Rick James
 Rose Royce
 Roxanne Shante
 Shalamar
 Shannon
 Sheila E.
 Shirley Caesar
 Shirley Murdock
 Silk
 Skyy
 Sly & the Family Stone
 Soul for Real
 Special Ed
 Spinners, The
 Sugarhill Gang
 Stacy Lattisaw
 Switch
 SWV
 Syleena Johnson
 Sylvers, The
 Sylvester
 Tammi Terrell
 Tasha Cobbs
 A Taste of Honey (as part of The Story of Disco)
 Teddy Pendergrass
 Teena Marie
 Thelma Houston
 Tony Terry
 Too Short
 Trick Daddy
 Troop
 Vesta Williams
 Whispers, The
 Whodini
 Will Downing
 Wilson Pickett
 Wyclef Jean
 Xscape
 Yarbrough and Peoples
 Yo-Yo
 Zapp (featured lead singer Roger Troutman)

References

External links
 
 

2008 American television series debuts
2000s American music television series
2010s American music television series
2000s American documentary television series
2010s American documentary television series
TV One (American TV channel) original programming
English-language television shows
Documentary television series about music